Tirumala alba is a species of nymphalid butterfly in the Danainae subfamily. It is endemic to China.

References

Tirumala (butterfly)
Insects of China
Butterflies described in 1994
Taxonomy articles created by Polbot